Thomas Graves Lawson (May 2, 1835 – April 16, 1912) was a Congressional Representative from Georgia.

Early life
Born near Eatonton, Georgia, Lawson attended private schools and graduated from Mercer University, Macon, Georgia, in 1855.
He studied law.

He married Mary Frances Reid (1835-1915) in Eatonton in November 1860.

Career
Lawson was admitted to the bar in 1857 and commenced practice in Eatonton, Georgia.
During the Civil War he served two years in the Confederate States Army. 
He served in the Georgia House of Representatives 1861-1866, 1889, and 1890. 
Lawson served as a delegate to the State Constitutional Convention in 1877.
He served on the board of trustees of Mercer University and the Eatonton Male and Female Academy.
Lawson served as judge of the Superior Courts of Ocmulgee circuit from 1879-1887.
He engaged in farming near Eatonton from 1888 to 1891.

Lawson was elected as a Democrat to the Fifty-second, Fifty-third, and Fifty-fourth Congresses serving from March 4, 1891 – March 3, 1897. He was an unsuccessful candidate for renomination in 1896, and resumed agricultural pursuits in Putnam County, Georgia.

Death
Lawson died in Eatonton, Georgia, April 16, 1912. He was interred in Pine Grove Cemetery.

References

Sources

External links
 

1835 births
1912 deaths
Confederate States Army soldiers
Democratic Party members of the United States House of Representatives from Georgia (U.S. state)
Georgia (U.S. state) state court judges
People from Eatonton, Georgia
19th-century American politicians
Mercer University alumni
19th-century American judges